The 2018–19 season covers the period from 1 July 2018 to 30 June 2019. It is Bury's 134th season since the club was founded in 1885, and their first in EFL League Two following relegation from EFL League One in 2017–18. Besides competing in League Two, the team participated in the FA Cup, the EFL Cup and the EFL Trophy. In the latter, they reached the semi-final stage for the first time.

Competitions

Pre-season friendlies
As part of Bury's pre-season schedule, they faced Rangers, Huddersfield Town, Liverpool and Everton.

League Two

League table

Results summary

Results by matchday

Matches
On 21 June 2018, the League Two fixtures for the forthcoming season were announced.

FA Cup

The first round draw was made live on BBC by Dennis Wise and Dion Dublin on 22 October. The draw for the second round was made live on BBC and BT by Mark Schwarzer and Glenn Murray on 12 November.

EFL Cup

On 15 June 2018, the draw for the first round was made in Vietnam.

EFL Trophy
On 13 July 2018, the initial group stage draw, bar the invited U-21 teams, was announced. The draw for the second round was made live on Talksport by Leon Britton and Steve Claridge on 16 November. On 8 December, the third round draw was made by Alan McInally and Matt Le Tissier on Soccer Saturday. The quarter-final draw was made on Sky Sports by Don Goodman and Thomas Frank on 10 January 2019. The draw for the semi-finals took place on 25 January live on Talksport.

Transfers

Transfers in

Transfers out

Loans in

Loans out

References

Bury
Bury F.C. seasons